Cerajë or Ceranja is a village in the municipality of Leposavić, in northern Kosovo. It has a population of 150-300, all ethnic Albanians, and is one of three Albanian-inhabited villages in Leposavić.

Notes

References

Villages in Leposavić